Franz Bernhard Wohlfahrt (born 1 July 1964) is an Austrian former professional footballer who played as a goalkeeper.

Club career
Born in Sankt Veit an der Glan, Carinthia, Wohlfahrt started his career at hometown outfit SV Sankt Veit. He turned professional at FK Austria Wien, where he would spend almost 20 years in two spells, winning six league titles and four domestic cups.

In 1996, aged 32, he finally moved abroad, joining Germany's VfB Stuttgart, and being essential as the club reached the final of the 1997–98 Cup Winner's Cup, lost 1–0 to Chelsea FC. Subsequently, he returned to his first club, retiring a few years later with amateurs SC Untersiebenbrunn.

Incident at Ajax–Austria Wien
On 27 September 1989, Wohlfahrt made the sports headlines when he was hit and injured by a bar, thrown by a home supporter at an Ajax–Austria Wien UEFA Cup match. Ajax subsequently was banned from European competition for a year.

International career
In 1983, Wohlfahrt was selected by Austria U-20's to play at the 1983 FIFA World Youth Championship. He made his debut for the senior side in an August 1987 friendly match against Switzerland, and was a participant at the 1998 FIFA World Cup, where he was a reserve behind Michael Konsel.

In total, Wohlfahrt earned 59 caps, his final international being in November 2001, a 2002 World Cup qualification match against Turkey, which Austria lost 5–0. He also has the unfortunate distinction of having netted nine goals in a single match, a 9–0 loss to Spain at Valencia's Mestalla Stadium on 27 March 1999.

Coaching and managerial career
In July 2006, Wohlfahrt began a coaching career, training goalkeepers at SK Schwadorf 1936, VfB Admira Wacker Mödling, and the national team. In 2008, he had his first head coach experience, with ASV Baden.

He has been goalkeeping coach for Austrian national team. On 9 January 2015, it was announced that Wohlfahrt would become the next Sporting Director of Austria Wien.

Honours
Austria Wien
 Austrian League: 1983–84, 1984–85, 1985–86, 1990–91, 1991–92, 1992–93
 Austrian Cup: 1985–86, 1989–90, 1991–92, 1993–94

VfB Stuttgart
 German Cup: 1996–97
 UEFA Cup Winners' Cup: Runner-up 1997–98

References

External links
Austria Wien archives 

1964 births
Living people
People from Sankt Veit an der Glan
Footballers from Carinthia (state)
Austrian footballers
Association football goalkeepers
Austria international footballers
Austria youth international footballers
1998 FIFA World Cup players
Austrian Football Bundesliga players
Bundesliga players
FK Austria Wien players
VfB Stuttgart players
Austrian expatriate footballers
Austrian expatriate sportspeople in Germany
Expatriate footballers in Germany
Association football goalkeeping coaches
FK Austria Wien non-playing staff